Myrceugenia miersiana is a species of plant in the family Myrtaceae. It is endemic to Brazil.

References

miersiana
Endemic flora of Brazil
Near threatened flora of South America
Taxonomy articles created by Polbot